The 1974–75 California Golden Seals season was the Seals' 8th season in the NHL. The team continued to be operated by the league until early 1975, when new local ownership led by Mel Swig, owner of the Fairmont Hotel in San Francisco, was found.  The Seals adopted new uniforms this season with new turquoise and gold colors.  They recorded a 15-point improvement over the previous season. In early 1975, rumors began to circulate that the Seals would be relocated to Denver, Colorado, although this did not come to pass.

On March 28, 1975, the Seals suffered the indignity of losing at home to the expansion Washington Capitals, 5–3, providing the Caps with the only road win of their inaugural season.

Offseason

Amateur Draft

Regular season
On March 28, 1975, the Seals lost at home 5–3 to Washington, giving the expansion Capitals their only road win of the season.

Final standings

Schedule and results

Player statistics

Skaters
Note: GP = Games played; G = Goals; A = Assists; Pts = Points; PIM = Penalties in minutes

†Denotes player spent time with another team before joining Seals. Stats reflect time with the Seals only. ‡Traded mid-season

Goaltenders
Note: GP = Games played; TOI = Time on ice (minutes); W = Wins; L = Losses; T = Ties; GA = Goals against; SO = Shutouts; GAA = Goals against average

Transactions
The Seals were involved in the following transactions during the 1974–75 season:

Trades

Additions and subtractions

Playoffs
The Seals did not qualify for the Stanley Cup playoffs this season.

References
 Seals on Hockey Database
 Seals on Database Hockey

California Golden Seals seasons
Cali
Cali
Calif
Calif